Jason Wynne Hughes is an American politician. He is a member of the Louisiana House of Representatives from the 100th District, serving since 2019. He is a member of the Democratic party.

Education and career

Hughes graduated from McDonogh #35 Senior High School. Hughes then attended Southern University, where he graduated with a bachelor's degree in political science. Hughes was a member of the Kappa Alpha Psi fraternity on campus.

Before becoming a politician himself, Hughes worked as a political strategist in Louisiana politics. Hughes has served as the assistant legislative director to former Louisiana Governor Kathleen Blanco, the regional manager for former US Senator Mary Landrieu, and the Director of Federal Relations for the city of New Orleans.

Louisiana House of Representatives
2015

In 2015, Hughes was a candidate for District 100 in the Louisiana House of Representatives, but he was disqualified from the Democratic primary for failing to file a tax return in 2010.

2019

Hughes ran for the same seat again in 2019 after incumbent John Bagneris decided to run for District 3 in the Louisiana State Senate. In the nonpartisan primary election, Hughes beat opponent Anthony Jackson Jr. with over 66% of the vote. The general election was canceled.

Committee assignments
Health and Welfare
Judiciary
Ways and Means
Joint Legislative Committee on Capital Outlay
House Select Committee on Homeland Security

Electoral history

References

External links
 
 Representative Jason Hughes – Official legislative website

Living people
Democratic Party members of the Louisiana House of Representatives
African-American state legislators in Louisiana
Southern University alumni
21st-century American politicians
Year of birth missing (living people)
21st-century African-American politicians